Merzdub is an album by the Jamie Saft performing compositions which used source material by Japanese noise artist Merzbow.

Reception

In his review for Allmusic, Sean Westergaard notes that "This could be the most gentle introduction to the world of Merzbow yet".

Track listing 
All compositions by Jamie Saft and Merzbow
 "Conquerer" – 9:13  
 "Beware Dub" – 9:16  
 "Skinning JLO" – 8:50  
 "Kantacky Fried Dub" – 6:36  
 "Visions Of Irie" – 6:43  
 "Dangermix" – 7:44  
 "Updub" – 10:48  
 "Slow Down Furry Dub" – 12:15

Personnel 
Jamie Saft – vocals, guitar, bass, drums, organ, synthesizer, dubs
Masami Akita – computer, source material

References 

2006 albums
Merzbow albums
Jamie Saft albums
Collaborative albums